Antheraea polyphemus, the Polyphemus moth, is a North American member of the family Saturniidae, the giant silk moths. It is a tan-colored moth, with an average wingspan of 15 cm (6 in). The most notable feature of the moth is its large, purplish eyespots on its two hindwings. The eyespots give it its name – from the Greek myth of the cyclops Polyphemus. The species was first described by Pieter Cramer in 1776. The species is widespread in continental North America, with local populations found throughout subarctic Canada and the United States. The caterpillar can eat 86,000 times its weight at emergence in a little less than two months.

Life cycle
The life cycle of the moth is much like that of any other Saturniidae species. It lays flat, light-brown eggs on the leaves of a number of host trees, preferring Ulmus americana (American elm), Betula (birch), Salix (willow), but also, more rarely, can survive on other trees, including: Quercus (oak), Acer (maple), Carya (hickory), Fagus (beech), Gleditsia triacanthos (honey locust), Juglans (walnut), Pyrus (pear and quince), Prunus (plum, peach, apricot, cherry, etc.), Sassafras, and Citrus.

When the eggs hatch, small yellow caterpillars emerge. As the caterpillars age, they molt five times (the fifth being into a pupa). Each instar is slightly different, but on their fifth and final instar, they become bright green with silver spots on their sides. They feed heavily on their host plant and can grow up to 3–4 inches long. They then spin cocoons of brown silk, usually wrapped in leaves of the host plant.

Two broods generally hatch each year throughout the United States, one in early spring and one in late summer. The moths close and then must pump their wings with fluid (hemolymph) to extend them. The females emit pheromones, which the male can detect through his large, plumose (feathery) antennae. Males can fly for miles to reach a female. 

After the moths mate, the female spends the majority of the remainder of her life laying eggs, while the male may mate several more times. Adults of this family of moths have vestigial mouths, meaning their mouth parts have been reduced. Because of this, they do not eat and only live as adults for less than one week.

In captivity, this moth is much more difficult to breed than other American saturniids such as Hyalophora cecropia, Callosamia promethea, or Actias luna. Kept in a cage, the male and female tend to ignore each other, unless a food plant (particularly oak leaves) is present.

Sexual dimorphism

Differentiating between sexes of this species is very easy. The most obvious difference is the plumose antennae. Males have very bushy antennae while females have moderately less bushy antennae. The male's antennae are used to detect pheromones released by unmated females. Another difference is that the females are slightly larger in the abdomen due to carrying eggs. A surprising amount of variation occurs within this species. Color patterns can range from a reddish cinnamon to a dark brown, but are almost always a shade of brown.

In the late 1950s, amateur lepidopterist Gary Botting hybridized the Polyphemus moth (then known as Telea polyphemus) with Antheraea yamamai from Japan and, later, Antheraea mylitta from India by transferring the pheromone-producing scent sacs from female "T. polyphemus" to the Antheraea females and allowing T. polyphemus males to mate with them. The resultant hybrids were displayed in his winning U.S. National Science Fair exhibit "Intergeneric hybridization among giant silk moths". After Botting consulted with genetic statistician J.B.S. Haldane and his wife, entomologist Helen Spurway, the Polyphemus moth was reclassified, becoming Antheraea polyphemus.

Conservation
Parasitic insects – such as the parasitoid wasp – lay their eggs in or on the young caterpillars. These then hatch into larvae that consume the insides of the caterpillars. Once the caterpillars pupate, the larvae themselves pupate, killing the Polyphemus pupa. The Compsilura concinnata tachinid fly, introduced to North America to control gypsy moth, is one particular known threat to the North American native Polyphemus moth.

Squirrels have also been known to consume the pupae of Polyphemus moths, decreasing the population greatly. Pruning of trees and leaving outdoor lights on at night can also be detrimental to the moths.

Response to threats
The Polyphemus moth uses defense mechanisms to protect itself from predators. One of its most distinctive mechanisms is a distraction display that serves to confuse, or simply distract, predators. This involves the large eyespots on its hindwings, which give the moth its name (from the cyclops Polyphemus in Greek mythology). Eyespots are also startle patterns, a subform of distraction patterns, used for camouflage via deceptive and blending coloration. 

Most startle patterns are brightly colored areas on the outer body of already camouflaged animals. (Another example of the use of startle patterns is the gray treefrog, with its bright-yellow leggings. When it leaps, a flash of bright yellow appears on its hind legs, usually startling the predator away from its prey.) Distraction patterns are believed to be a form of mimicry, meant to misdirect predators by markings on the moths' wings. The pattern on the hindwings of the Polyphemus moth resembles that on the head of the great horned owl (Bubo virginianus).  This defense mechanism often results in wing damage to the moth, which does not affect the insects flight.

References

External links

 http://www.cdfd.org.in/wildsilkbase/info_moths.php
Polyphemus moth adult and caterpillar photographs
Picture journal of Polyphemus developments
How to rear Saturniid moths
The Polyphemus Moth
Polyphemus moth on the UF / IFAS Featured Creatures website.

Antheraea
Moths of North America
Moths described in 1776
Taxa named by Pieter Cramer